Cryptochilus acuminatus, synonym Eria carinata, is a species of orchid. It is native to Nepal, Bhutan, Assam, Thailand, Vietnam and peninsular Malaysia.

Nudol is a phenanthrene of C. carinatus.

References 

Eriinae
Flora of Assam (region)
Flora of Bhutan
Orchids of Nepal
Orchids of Thailand
Orchids of Vietnam
Orchids of Malaysia
Plants described in 1845